Andrey Kazaryn (born 27 October 1984) is a Belarusian professional footballer who plays for Krumkachy Minsk.

Career
Born in Pinsk, Kazaryn has played in the Belarusian Premier League with FC Belshina Bobruisk, FC Smorgon, FC Neman Grodno and FC Torpedo Zhodino.

References

External links

1984 births
Living people
Sportspeople from Pinsk
Belarusian footballers
Association football midfielders
Belarusian expatriate footballers
Expatriate footballers in Russia
FC Volna Pinsk players
FC Torpedo Minsk players
FC Belshina Bobruisk players
FC Sakhalin Yuzhno-Sakhalinsk players
FC Smorgon players
FC Neman Grodno players
FC Torpedo-BelAZ Zhodino players
FC Gorodeya players
FC SKVICH Minsk players
FC Dnepr Mogilev players
FC Uzda players
FC Krumkachy Minsk players
Belarusian football managers